Joseph the Carpenter is an oil painting by Georges de La Tour created circa 1642. The painting depicts a young Jesus with Saint Joseph, his earthly father.

Joseph drills a piece of wood with an auger. The shape of the auger reflects the shape of the Cross and the geometry of the wood arrayed on the floor, set cross-wise to the seated child Christ, is a foreshadowing of the crucifixion. John Rupert Martin writes that Jesus' patience represents "filial obedience and the acceptance of his destiny as martyr".

This painting, created ca. 1642, is one of several tenebrist paintings by La Tour. Others include The Education of the Virgin, the Penitent Magdalene, and The Dream of Saint Joseph. In all these works, a single, strong light source is a central element, surrounded by cast shadows. In both Joseph the Carpenter and The Education of the Virgin, the young Christ is represented, hand raised, as if in benediction, with the candlelight shining through the flesh as an allegorical reference to Christ as the "Light of the World."

References

Further reading
 Jesse Bryant Wilder & John Garton. Art History for Dummies. For Dummies (2007), p. 214. .
 Hugh Brigstocke. "Georges de La Tour". In The Oxford Companion to Western Art. Oxford University Press (2001). .
 Michel Sylvestre. "Georges de La Tour" In Grove Dictionary of Art. Oxford University Press (2003). .
 Akili Kumasi. Fatherhood Principles of Joseph the Carpenter: Examples of Godly Fatherhood. GIL Publications (2009).  .

External link

1645 paintings
Paintings by Georges de La Tour
Paintings depicting Jesus
Paintings in the Louvre by French artists
Paintings of Saint Joseph